Gangs of New York is a 2002 American historical drama film directed by Martin Scorsese and written by Jay Cocks, Steven Zaillian and Kenneth Lonergan, based on Herbert Asbury's 1927 book The Gangs of New York. The film stars Leonardo DiCaprio, Daniel Day-Lewis and Cameron Diaz, with Jim Broadbent, John C. Reilly, Henry Thomas, Stephen Graham, Eddie Marsan and Brendan Gleeson in supporting roles.

The film is set in 1863, when a long-running Catholic–Protestant feud erupts into violence, just as an Irish immigrant group is protesting against the threat of conscription.

Scorsese spent twenty years developing the project until Harvey Weinstein and his production company Miramax Films acquired it in 1999.

Made in Cinecittà, Rome and Long Island City, New York City, Gangs of New York was completed by 2001 but its release was delayed due to the September 11 attacks. The film was theatrically released in the United States on December 20, 2002, and grossed over $193 million worldwide. It was met with generally positive reviews and Daniel Day-Lewis's performance was highly acclaimed. It received ten nominations at the 75th Academy Awards, including Best Picture, Best Director for Scorsese and Best Actor for Day-Lewis.

Plot

In the 1846 slum of the Five Points, two gangs, the Protestant Confederation of American Natives, led by William "Bill the Butcher" Cutting, and the Irish Catholic immigrant Dead Rabbits, led by "Priest" Vallon, engage in their final battle to determine which faction will hold sway over the territory. At the end of the battle, Bill kills Vallon and declares the Dead Rabbits outlawed. Having witnessed this, Vallon's young son hides the knife that killed his father and is taken to an orphanage on Blackwell's Island.

In 1862, Vallon's son, ‘Amsterdam’ returns to the Five Points seeking revenge and retrieves the knife. An old acquaintance, Johnny Sirocco, familiarizes him with the local clans of gangs, all of whom pay tribute to Bill, who remains in control of the territory. Amsterdam is introduced to Bill but keeps his past a secret as he seeks recruitment into the gang. He learns many of his father's former allies are now in Bill's employ. Each year, Bill celebrates the anniversary of his victory over the Dead Rabbits and Amsterdam secretly plans to kill him publicly during this celebration. Amsterdam soon becomes attracted to pickpocket and grifter Jenny Everdeane, with whom Johnny is also infatuated. Amsterdam gains Bill's confidence and becomes his protégé, involving him in the dealings of corrupt Tammany Hall politician William M. Tweed. Amsterdam saves Bill from an assassination attempt and is tormented by the thought that he may have done so out of honest devotion.

On the evening of the anniversary, Johnny, in a fit of jealousy over Jenny's affections for Amsterdam, reveals Amsterdam's true identity and intentions to Bill. Bill baits Amsterdam with a knife throwing act involving Jenny. As Bill toasts Priest Vallon, Amsterdam throws his knife, but Bill deflects it and wounds Amsterdam with a counter throw. Bill then beats him and burns his cheek with a hot blade. Going into hiding, Jenny implores him to escape with her to San Francisco. Amsterdam, however, returns to the Five Points seeking vengeance and announces his return by hanging a dead rabbit in Paradise Square. Bill sends corrupt Irish policeman Mulraney to investigate, but Amsterdam kills him and hangs his body in the square as well. In retaliation, Bill has Johnny beaten and run through with a pike, leaving it to Amsterdam to end his suffering. When Amsterdam's gang beats McGloin, one of Bill's lieutenants, Bill and the Natives march on the church and are met by Amsterdam and the Dead Rabbits. No violence ensues, but Bill promises to return soon. The incident garners newspaper coverage, and Amsterdam presents Tweed with a plan to defeat Bill's influence: Tweed will back the candidacy of Monk McGinn for sheriff and Amsterdam will secure the Irish vote for Tammany. Monk wins in a landslide, and a humiliated Bill murders him. McGinn's death prompts an angry Amsterdam to challenge Bill to a gang battle in Paradise Square, which Bill accepts.

The Civil War draft riots break out just as the gangs are preparing to fight, and Union Army soldiers are deployed to control the rioters. As the rival gangs fight, cannon fire from ships is directed into Paradise Square, interrupting their battle shortly before it begins. Many of the gang members are killed by the naval gunfire, soldiers or rioters. Bill and Amsterdam face off against one another until Bill gets wounded by a piece of shrapnel. Amsterdam then uses his father's knife to kill Bill.

Amsterdam buries the knife next to his father in a cemetery in Brooklyn, erecting a makeshift headstone with the name William Cutting over it now alongside the actual tombstone of Priest Vallon. As Amsterdam and Jenny leave, the skyline changes as modern New York City is built over the next century, from the Brooklyn Bridge to the World Trade Center, and the cemetery becomes overgrown and forgotten.

Cast

Production

Filmmaker Martin Scorsese had grown up in Little Italy in the borough of Manhattan in New York City during the 1950s. At the time, he had noticed there were parts of his neighborhood that were much older than the rest, including tombstones from the 1810s in Old St. Patrick's Cathedral, cobblestone streets and small basements located under more recent large buildings; this sparked Scorsese's curiosity about the history of the area: "I gradually realized that the Italian-Americans weren't the first ones there, that other people had been there before us. As I began to understand this, it fascinated me. I kept wondering, how did New York look? What were the people like? How did they walk, eat, work, dress?"

Writing
In 1970, Scorsese came across Herbert Asbury's The Gangs of New York: An Informal History of the Underworld (1927) about the city's nineteenth-century criminal underworld and found it to be a revelation. In the portraits of the city's criminals, Scorsese saw the potential for an American epic about the battle for the modern American democracy. At the time, Scorsese was a young director without money or fame; by the end of the decade, with the success of crime films such as Mean Streets (1973), about his old neighborhood, and Taxi Driver (1976), he was a rising star. In 1979, he acquired screen rights to Asbury's book; however, it took twenty years to get the production moving forward. Difficulties arose with reproducing the monumental cityscape of nineteenth-century New York with the style and detail Scorsese wanted; almost nothing in New York City looked as it did in that time, and filming elsewhere was not an option. As of 1991, the project was originally to be financed by Universal Pictures on a budget of $30 million. However, the studio assigned the rights to the project to Disney in 1997, whose then-chairman Joe Roth turned down the film due to its excessive violence, which was "not appropriate for a Disney-themed movie". 

Scorsese took the film to Warner Bros., being contractually obligated to make a film for the studio; the film was however declined by Warner Bros. as well, and afterward declined similarly by 20th Century Fox, Paramount Pictures and Metro-Goldwyn-Mayer (MGM). Eventually, in 1999, Scorsese was able to find a partnership with Harvey Weinstein, noted producer and co-chairman of Miramax Films. As the film had a large budget of nearly $100 million, Weinstein then sold international distribution rights to the project to Graham King's Initial Entertainment Group for about $65 million to secure the required funds. Shortly after, Touchstone Pictures joined Miramax in funding the film, in exchange for a portion of the proceeds from domestic distribution. Jay Cocks was retained by Scorsese for the film script adaptation which was reported in The New Yorker in March 2000 as having gone through nine revised drafts of development with Scorsese.

Set design
In order to create the sets that Scorsese envisioned, the production was filmed at the large Cinecittà Studio in Rome, Italy. Production designer Dante Ferretti recreated over a mile of mid-nineteenth century New York buildings, consisting of a five-block area of Lower Manhattan, including the Five Points slum, a section of the East River waterfront including two full-sized sailing ships, a thirty-building stretch of lower Broadway, a patrician mansion, and replicas of Tammany Hall, a church, a saloon, a Chinese theater, and a gambling casino. For the Five Points, Ferretti recreated George Catlin's painting of the area.

Rehearsals and character development

Particular attention was also paid to the speech of characters, as loyalties were often revealed by their accents. The film's voice coach, Tim Monich, resisted using a generic Irish brogue and instead focused on distinctive dialects of Ireland and Great Britain. As DiCaprio's character was born in Ireland but raised in the United States, his accent was designed to be a blend of accents typical of the half-Americanized. To develop the unique, lost accents of the Yankee "Nativists" such as Daniel Day-Lewis's character, Monich studied old poems, ballads, newspaper articles (which sometimes imitated spoken dialect as a form of humor) and the Rogue's Lexicon, a book of underworld idioms compiled by New York's police commissioner, so that his men would be able to tell what criminals were talking about. An important piece was an 1892 wax cylinder recording of Walt Whitman reciting four lines of a poem in which he pronounced the word "Earth" as "Uth", and the "a" of "an" nasal and flat, like "ayan". Monich concluded that native nineteenth-century New Yorkers probably sounded something like the proverbial Brooklyn cabbie of the mid-20th century.

Filming

Principal photography began in New York and Rome on December 18, 2000, and ended on March 30, 2001. Due to the strong personalities and clashing visions of director and producer, the three year production became a story in and of itself. Scorsese strongly defended his artistic vision on issues of taste and length while Weinstein fought for a streamlined, more commercial version. During the delays, noted actors such as Robert De Niro and Willem Dafoe had to leave the production due to conflicts with their other productions. Costs overshot the original budget by 25%, bringing the total cost over $100 million. The increased budget made the film vital to Miramax Films' short-term success.

Post-production and distribution
After post-production was nearly completed in 2001, the film was delayed for over a year. The official justification was after the September 11, 2001, attacks, certain elements of the picture may have made audiences uncomfortable; the film's closing shot is a view of modern-day New York City, complete with the World Trade Center's towers, despite them having been destroyed by the attacks over a year before the film's release. However, this explanation was refuted in Scorsese's own contemporary statements, where he noted that the production was still filming pick-ups even into October 2002. The filmmakers had also considered having the towers removed from the shot to acknowledge their disappearance, or remove the entire sequence altogether. It was ultimately decided to keep the towers unaltered.

Weinstein kept demanding cuts to the film's length, and some of those cuts were eventually made. In December 2001, film critic Jeffrey Wells reviewed a purported workprint of the film as it existed in the fall of 2001. Wells reported the work print lacked narration, was about 20 minutes longer, and although it was "different than the [theatrical] version ... scene after scene after scene play[s] exactly the same in both." Despite the similarities, Wells found the work print to be richer and more satisfying than the theatrical version. While Scorsese has stated the theatrical version is his final cut, he reportedly "passed along [the] three-hour-plus [work print] version of Gangs on tape [to friends] and confided, 'Putting aside my contractual obligation to deliver a shorter, two-hour-and-forty-minute version to Miramax, this is the version I'm happiest with,' or words to that effect."

In an interview with Roger Ebert, Scorsese clarified the real issues in the cutting of the film. Ebert notes,

Soundtrack

Robbie Robertson supervised the soundtrack's collection of eclectic pop, folk, and neo-classical tracks.

Historical accuracy

Scorsese received both praise and criticism for historical depictions in the film. In a PBS interview for the History News Network, George Washington University Professor Tyler Anbinder said that the visuals and discrimination of immigrants in the film were historically accurate, but both the amount of violence depicted and the number of Chinese, particularly female, immigrants were greater in the film than in reality.

Asbury's book described the Bowery Boys, Plug Uglies, True Blue Americans, Shirt Tails, and Dead Rabbits, who were named after their battle standard, a dead rabbit on a pike. The book also described William Poole, the inspiration for William "Bill the Butcher" Cutting, a member of the Bowery Boys, a bare-knuckle boxer, and a leader of the Know Nothing political movement. Poole did not come from the Five Points and was assassinated nearly a decade before the Draft Riots. Both the fictional Bill and the real one had butcher shops, but Poole is not known to have killed anyone. The book also described other famous gangsters from the era such as Red Rocks Farrell, Slobbery Jim and Hell-Cat Maggie, who filed her front teeth to points and wore artificial brass fingernails.

Anbinder said that Scorsese's recreation of the visual environment of mid-19th-century New York City and the Five Points "couldn't have been much better". All sets were built completely on the exterior stages of Cinecittà Studios in Rome. By 1860, New York City had 200,000 mostly Catholic Irish immigrants in a population of 800,000.

According to Paul S. Boyer, "The period from the 1830s to the 1850s was a time of almost continuous disorder and turbulence among the urban poor. The decade from 1834–1844 saw more than 200 major gang wars in New York City alone, and in other cities the pattern was similar."

As early as 1839, Mayor Philip Hone said: "This city is infested by gangs of hardened wretches" who "patrol the streets making night hideous and insulting all who are not strong enough to defend themselves." The large gang fight depicted in the film as occurring in 1846 is fictional, though there was one between the Bowery Boys and Dead Rabbits in the Five Points on July 4, 1857, which is not mentioned in the film. Reviewer Vincent DiGirolamo concludes that "Gangs of New York becomes a historical epic with no change over time. The effect is to freeze ethno-cultural rivalries over the course of three decades and portray them as irrational ancestral hatreds unaltered by demographic shifts, economic cycles and political realignments."

In the film, the Draft Riots of July 1863 are depicted as both destructive and violent. Records indicate the riots resulted in more than one hundred deaths, including the lynching of 11 free African-Americans. They were especially targeted by the Irish, in part because of fears of job competition that more freed slaves would cause in the city. The bombardment of the city by Navy ships offshore to quell the riots is wholly fictitious. The film references the infamous Tweed Courthouse, as "Boss" Tweed refers to plans for the structure as being "modest" and "economical".

In the film, Chinese Americans were common enough in the city to have their own community and public venues. Although Chinese people migrated to America as early as the 1840s, significant Chinese migration to New York City did not begin until 1869, the time when the transcontinental railroad was completed. The Chinese theater on Pell St. was not finished until the 1890s. The Old Brewery, the overcrowded tenement shown in the movie in both 1846 and 1862–63, was actually demolished in 1852.

Release
The original target release date was December 21, 2001, in time for the 2001 Academy Awards but the production overshot that goal as Scorsese was still filming. A twenty-minute clip, billed as an "extended preview", debuted at the 2002 Cannes Film Festival and was shown at a star-studded event at the Palais des Festivals et des Congrès with Scorsese, DiCaprio, Diaz and Weinstein in attendance.

Harvey Weinstein then wanted the film to open on December 25, 2002, but a potential conflict with another film starring Leonardo DiCaprio, Catch Me If You Can produced by DreamWorks, caused him to move the opening day to an earlier position. After negotiations between several parties, including the interests of DiCaprio, Weinstein and DreamWorks' Jeffrey Katzenberg, the decision was made on economic grounds: DiCaprio did not want to face a conflict of promoting two movies opening against each other; Katzenberg was able to convince Weinstein that the violence and adult material in Gangs of New York would not necessarily attract families on Christmas. Of main concern to all involved was attempting to maximize the film's opening day, an important part of film industry economics.

Gangs of New York was released on VHS and a 2-disc DVD July 1, 2003, the film was split on both discs. A Blu-ray version of the film was released July 1, 2008.

After three years in production, the film was released on December 20, 2002, a year after its original planned release date. While the film has been released on DVD and Blu-ray, there are no plans to revisit the theatrical cut or prepare a "director's cut" for home video release. "Marty doesn't believe in that", editor Thelma Schoonmaker stated. "He believes in showing only the finished film."

Reception

Box office
The film made $77,812,000 in Canada and the United States. It also took $23,763,699 in Japan and $16,358,580 in the United Kingdom. Worldwide the film grossed a total of $193,772,504.

Critical reception
On review aggregator Rotten Tomatoes, the film has an approval rating of 72% based on 214 reviews, with an average rating of 7.10/10. The website's critical consensus reads, "Though flawed, the sprawling, messy Gangs of New York is redeemed by impressive production design and Day-Lewis's electrifying performance." Metacritic, gave the film a score of 72 out of 100, based on 39 critics, indicating "generally favorable reviews". Audiences polled by CinemaScore gave the film an average grade of "B" on an A+ to F scale.

Roger Ebert praised the film but believed it fell short of Scorsese's best work, while his At the Movies co-host Richard Roeper called it a "masterpiece" and declared it a leading contender for Best Picture. Paul Clinton of CNN called the film "a grand American epic". In Variety, Todd McCarthy wrote that the film "falls somewhat short of great film status, but is still a richly impressive and densely realized work that bracingly opens the eye and mind to untaught aspects of American history." McCarthy singled out the meticulous attention to historical detail and production design for particular praise.

Some critics were disappointed with the film, with one review on CinemaBlend feeling it was overly violent with few characters worth caring about. Norman Berdichevsky of the New English Review wrote in a negative critique that some locals in Spain who had watched Gangs of New York had several anti-American beliefs "confirmed" afterwards, which he felt was due to the film's gratuitous violence, historical inaccuracies, and general depiction of American society "in the worst possible light". Others felt it tried to tackle too many themes without saying anything unique about them, and that the overall story was weak.

Cameron Diaz's performance as Irish immigrant pickpocket Jenny Everdeane was particularly criticised, and has regularly been cited as an example of poor casting and as one of the worst Irish accents in film.

Top ten lists
Gangs of New York was listed on many critics' top ten lists of 2002.

 1st – Peter Travers, Rolling Stone
 1st – Richard Roeper, Ebert & Roeper
 2nd – Richard Corliss, Time
 2nd – Ann Hornaday, The Washington Post
 3rd – F. X. Feeney, L.A. Weekly
 3rd – Scott Tobias, The A.V. Club
 5th – Jami Bernard, New York Daily News
 5th – Claudia Puig, USA Today
 6th – Mike Clark, USA Today
 6th – Nathan Rabin, The A.V. Club
 6th – Chris Kaltenbach, Baltimore Sun
 8th – A.O. Scott, The New York Times
 9th – Stephen Holden, The New York Times
 Top 10 (listed alphabetically) – Mark Olsen, L.A. Weekly
 Top 10 (listed alphabetically) – Carrie Rickey, Philadelphia Inquirer

Accolades

See also

 Irish Americans in New York City
 Irish Brigade (US)
 List of identities in The Gangs of New York (book)

References

Further reading

External links
 
 
 
 
 

2002 films
2002 crime drama films
2000s American films
2000s English-language films
2000s gang films
American Civil War films
American crime drama films
American epic films
American films about revenge
American gang films
BAFTA winners (films)
Cultural depictions of P. T. Barnum
Films about Catholicism
Films about the Irish Mob
Films based on non-fiction books
Films based on works by American writers
Films directed by Martin Scorsese
Films postponed due to the September 11 attacks
Films scored by Howard Shore
Films set in 1846
Films set in 1862
Films set in New York City
Films shot at Cinecittà Studios
Films whose director won the Best Director Golden Globe
Films with screenplays by Jay Cocks
Films with screenplays by Kenneth Lonergan
Films with screenplays by Steven Zaillian
Irish Diaspora films
Initial Entertainment Group films
Miramax films
Touchstone Pictures films